Jiangsu Qingjiang Middle School()or Qingzhong() for short is a high school located in Huai'an, Jiangsu, People’s Republic of China. In 2010, the 60th anniversary of Qingjiang Middle School had a wonderful end on National Day. Han Haijian() is the present president.

History
Jiangsu Qingjiang Middle School was opened in 1951 as Subei Huaiyin Technical Academy of Finance. It was approved as provincial key middle school in 1980. In 2000, the school took the lead to become the national-level model high school in Huai’an. In October this year, its name was changed to Jiangsu Qingjiang Middle School. In 2004, it became one of the first four-star high schools in Jiangsu.

Facility
In 2000, the school put more than 50 million yuan in its modernization strategy. To this point, great changes have taken place. The education conditions have been improved from the root. In 2003, leaders spent 90 million yuan on its expansion which brought the total investment up to 140 million yuan. The newly built teaching buildings cover 80 thousand square meters. The whole project was finished in August 2005. It pays more attention to the all-around development of students. There are multi-purpose rooms for report, the school radio station, the inside gym, and the 800-meter plastic track.

Foreign communication
Jiangsu Qingjiang Middle School has recently dispatched twenty-two teachers to Japan, Australia, Canada, etc. to study abroad. In 2004, the school was admitted to employ foreign teachers. Leaders also accepted many experts from Japan, America, Britain, Germany, and so on to school to conduct observation and communication work.

Education feature
Qingjiang Middle School is regarded as the model of using multimedia in education and utilizing information technology education. It held public multimedia lessons for ten years. They pay more attention to the education feature of developing information technology. Along the terms of English education, the school is one of the foreign language schools of national basic education experiments. The school has a high quality of English teachers to ensure the high quality of education. English corner, interesting extracurricular activities, and other activities are also held to improve oral English and the ability to communicate. Pertaining to art and sports education, it can combine the extracurricular knowledge with the knowledge in the classroom. Keeping universal and improving is conducted in the same time. About 100 students learning arts or sports every year are admitted to Rank A Universities. On science education, Jiangsu Qingjiang Middle School is among the schools who have scientific capabilities. Students often take part in subject competitions, inventions, and production.

Presidents
1953–1964 Xu Yuling
1965–1968 Ji Bitian, as the school secretary of Party branch
1969–1970 Zhou Hongru, the head of revolutionary committee
1973–1975 Shen Qianzhen, as the school secretary of Party branch
1975–1977 Jin Ziyao, as the school secretary of Party branch
1978–1983 Hu Xueqin
1984–1988 Fan Qingdong
1988–1997 Dai Jiacai
1997–     Han Haijian, as the president and the secretary of Party committee

References

Further reading

External links
http://www.jsqz.com.cn/
http://www.topincn.net/zh080010/zh080010.htm#
http://tupian.hudong.com/a0_06_43_01300000260344122835439797937_jpg.html
http://www.topincn.net/zh080010/qjzx-h110.htm
http://bbs.huainet.com/thread-764120-1-1.html

High schools in Jiangsu
Educational institutions established in 1951
1951 establishments in China
Huai'an
Junior secondary schools in China